The Pennsylvania State Game Lands Number 247 are Pennsylvania State Game Lands in Armstrong County in Pennsylvania in the United States providing hunting, bird watching, and other activities.

Geography
SGL 247 consists of a single parcel located in North Buffalo Township. It lies in the watershed of the Allegheny River, part of the Ohio River watershed. Nearby communities include populated places Cadogan, McHadden, North Buffalo, Sistersville, and West Ford City. Pennsylvania Route 28 runs to the northwest of SGL 247, Pennsylvania Route 128 runs to the southwest.

Statistics

Biology
Hunting and furtaking species include bear (Ursus americanus), Bobcat (Lynx rufus), Coyote (Canis latrans), deer (Odocoileus virginianus), Gray fox (Urocyon cinereoargenteus), Red fox (Vulpes vulpes), grouse (Bonasa umbellus), mink (Neovison vison), Raccoon (Procyoon lotor), squirrel (Sciurus carolinensis), and turkey (Meleagris gallopavo). The habitat management goal of SGL 137 is to favor requirements for deer and grouse, which coincides with the non-game focus for aspen stands, interior forest conditions as well as forested riparian areas. In addition, management activities will consider species of concern such as bats (Order Chiroptera), Chimney swift (Chaetura pelagica), Louisiana waterthrush (Parkesia motacilla), and Cerulean warbler (Setophaga cerulea).

See also
 Pennsylvania State Game Lands
 Pennsylvania State Game Lands Number 105, also located in Armstrong County
 Pennsylvania State Game Lands Number 137, also located in Armstrong County
 Pennsylvania State Game Lands Number 259, also located in Armstrong County
 Pennsylvania State Game Lands Number 287, also located in Armstrong County

References

247
Protected areas of Armstrong County, Pennsylvania